Juan Víctores de Velasco, O.S.B. (1644–1713) was a Roman Catholic prelate who served as Bishop of Trujillo (1707–1713) and Bishop of Santa Marta (1694–1707).

Biography
Juan Víctores de Velasco was born in Burgos, Spain in 1644 and ordained a priest in the Order of Saint Benedict.
On 19 Jul 1694, he was appointed during the papacy of Pope Innocent XII as Bishop of Santa Marta.
On 21 Oct 1694, he was consecrated bishop at the convent San Martín in Madrid, Spain. 
On 28 Nov 1707, he was appointed during the papacy of Pope Clement XI as Bishop of Trujillo.
He served as Bishop of Trujillo until his death on 10 Dec 1713.

While bishop, he presided over the priestly ordination of Salvador Bermúdez y Becerra, Bishop of Concepción (1704).

References

External links and additional sources
 (for Chronology of Bishops) 
 (for Chronology of Bishops) 
 (for Chronology of Bishops) 
 (for Chronology of Bishops) 

17th-century Roman Catholic bishops in New Granada
18th-century Roman Catholic bishops in Peru
Bishops appointed by Pope Innocent XII
Bishops appointed by Pope Clement XI
1644 births
1713 deaths
Benedictine bishops
18th-century Roman Catholic bishops in New Granada
Roman Catholic bishops of Trujillo
Roman Catholic bishops of Santa Marta